HMS Veteran was an Admiralty modified W-class destroyer built for the Royal Navy.  She was ordered in April 1918 from John Brown & Company under the 14th War Program. She was the third Royal Navy ship to carry the name.

Construction
HMS Veterans keel was laid on 30 August 1918 at the James Brown & Company Shipyard in Clydebank, Scotland.  She was launched on 26 April 1919.  She was 312 feet overall in length with a beam of 29.5 feet.  Her mean draught was 9 feet, and would reach 11.25 feet under full load.  She had a displacement of 1,140 tons standard and up to 1,550 full load.

She was propelled by three Yarrow type water tube boilers powering Brown-Curtis geared steam turbines developing 27,000 shp driving twin propellers for a maximum designed speed of 34 knots.  She was oil-fired and had a bunkerage of 320 to 350 tons.  This gave a range of between 3500 nautical miles at 15 knots to 900 nautical miles at 32 knots.

She shipped four BL 4.7 in Mk.I guns, mount P Mk.I naval guns in four single centre-line mounts.  The turrets were disposed as two forward and two aft in super imposed firing positions.  She also carried two QF 2 pdr Mk.II "pom-pom" (40 mm L/39) mounted abeam between funnels.  Abaft of the 2nd funnel, she carried six 21-inch torpedo tubes in two triple mounts on the centre-line.

Inter-war years
HMS Veteran was commissioned into the Royal Navy on 13 November 1919 with the pennant number D72.  After commissioning she was assigned to the 3rd Destroyer Flotilla of the Atlantic Fleet.  The Flotilla was transferred to the Mediterranean Fleet in 1923, then in 1926 to China Station.  She was involved in the Nanking Incident in March 1927.  In early 1930s after a refit, she was placed in reserve as more modern destroyers came on line.

World War II
In 1939, HMS Veteran was in dockyard hands for a major refit.  As with most elderly destroyers allocated to escort duties, the after bank of torpedo tubes was removed and replaced with a single QF 12 pounder 12 cwt naval gun. They also landed 'Y' gun to receive additional space for depth charge gear and stowage.  She was recommissioned into service in November 1939 commanded by Lieut. Cdr J E Broome, a veteran of First World War.

In December upon completion of post refit trials, HMS Veteran joined the 18th Destroyer Flotilla based at Plymouth in the Western Approaches Command for Channel escort and anti-submarine patrols.

Following an application by Lt Cdr Broome HMS Veteran was made a life member of the Company of Veteran Motors in early 1940. The ship was presented with a king size Veteran Motorist insignia that was subsequently mounted on the front of the ship's bridge. Members of CVM also supplied the crew with welfare supplies including knitted clothing.

April saw HMS Veteran transferred to Scapa Flow after the German invasion of Norway.  She escorted convoys for the Norwegian Campaign, including the withdrawal until damaged in a collision with the mercantile Ngkoa on 29 May.  At this time her pennant number was changed to I72 for visual signalling purposes.

Upon release from the Home Fleet HMS Veteran was transferred to Harwich for convoy defence in the North Sea. From July to September employed in anti-invasion patrols and convoy defence. HMS Veteran was damaged by an acoustic mine and required repair. At this time she had her weaponry upgraded with the fitting of 20mm Oerlikon cannons for short range anti-air defence.

At the end of September, HMS Veteran was transferred to the Western Approaches Command and based out of Londonderry for Atlantic convoy defence.  She escorted several convoys outbound and inbound until involved in a collision with HMS Verity in January 1941.

February saw HMS Veteran at Barrow-in Furness undergoing repair and refit.  A Medium Frequency Direction Finder Outfit FM7 was fitted for navigation but was not useful against U-boats as they used a higher frequency for radio communications.  Her refit and trials complete on 13 March.  She resumed her duties in Atlantic convoy defence out of Londonderry.

Later that month, on 20 March, she participated in the search for the German warships  and   In September 1941, she dropped depth charges on German U-boat  at position 63°59'N, 34°48'W, which had attacked convoy SC 42. This was given after a post-war analysis of the attack.

In January 1942, she underwent conversion to a short range escort (SRE) at a commercial shipyard in London. To augment the earlier changes, the replacement of the after bank of torpedo tubes with a single QF 12-pounder 12 cwt naval gun and the landing of 'Y' gun for additional space for depth charge gear and stowage, the 2 pdr "pompoms" were replaced with two Oerlikon 20 mm cannons amidships and the 'A' gun was replaced by a Hedgehog anti-submarine mortar. A Type 271 centimetric target indication radar was added on the bridge and a Type 286M air warning radar was installed on the main mast.

By March with her workups following conversion complete she was detached for service off the East Coast of the US and Canada.  From May to August she was deployed for convoy defence between US and Canadian Ports to Newfoundland.

In September she was nominated for a special convoy RB1.

Loss
Groups Vorwarts and Pfiel were also directed against RB1. On the 25th the SS Boston and SS New York were sunk and the convoy scattered. On 26 September the convoy was ordered to reform and HMS Veteran came across the survivors of the SS New York. HMS Veteran sank quickly in position 54.51N 23.04W south of Iceland after an explosion. All hands, as well as a number of survivors from the SS New York were lost. Other survivors from SS New York were later rescued.

Image gallery

Notes

Bibliography

External links

 A service history of HMS Veteran was compiled by the late Lieutenant Commander Geoffry Mason and can be found at the Naval History Web Site
 U-Boat.net

 

Ships built on the River Clyde
1919 ships
World War II destroyers of the United Kingdom
Ships sunk by German submarines in World War II
World War II shipwrecks in the Atlantic Ocean
V and W-class destroyers of the Royal Navy
Maritime incidents in September 1942
Ships lost with all hands